Haraze Al Biar is one of three departments in Hadjer-Lamis, a region of Chad. Its capital is Massaguet.

Subdivisions 
Dagana is divided into four sub-prefectures:

 Massaguet
 Mani
 N'Djamena Fara

Villages 
 

Adjodol

References 

Departments of Chad
Hadjer-Lamis Region